The Peugeot Type 108 is a motor car produced by the French auto-maker Peugeot at their Audincourt plant in 1908.   301 were produced.

Body formats included a four-seater “Droschke” as well as a delivery van with space for two.

Sources and further reading 
 Wolfgang Schmarbeck: Alle Peugeot Automobile 1890-1990. Motorbuch-Verlag. Stuttgart 1990. 

Type 108
Cars introduced in 1908
Brass Era vehicles

it:Peugeot Type 63, 99, 108 e 118